Buddha Utthayan (Buddhist Park) is a park-like area in Khao Dan Phra Bat, Tambon Bung, just north of Amnat Charoen. It is known for Phra Mongkhon Ming Muang, also called Phra Yai, a major Buddha image located in the park.

Phra Mongkhon Ming Mueang is a Buddha image in the attitude of Subduing Mara. It is located in front of a temple. Designed by Chitr Buabud in 1965, the  Buddha image was built in Northern Indian style, by steel-reinforced concrete over the old one and decorated with golden mosaic. This Buddha image is now the logo of Amnat Charoen Province.

Behind Phra Mongkhon Ming Mueang, there are two strangely shaped Buddha images. They are named Phra Lahai, or Phra Khilai by the locals, which means "not beautiful". These ancient Buddha images were found in 1962 during construction of the pond's bank. Locals believe they bring good luck and often come to worship.

Parks in Thailand
Geography of Amnat Charoen province
Tourist attractions in Amnat Charoen province